Sol do Meio Dia (Portuguese for "Noon Sun") is an album by Brazilian composer, guitarist and pianist Egberto Gismonti recorded in 1977 and released in 1978 on the ECM label.

Reception
The Allmusic review by Stephen Cook awarded the album 4 stars, calling it an "impressive combo outing... Highly recommended".

Track listing
All compositions by Egberto Gismonti
 "Palácio de Pinturas" - 5:37
 "Raga" - 8:52
 "Kalimba" - 5:19
 "Coração" - 6:01
 "Café / Sapain / Dança Solitária No. 2 / Baião Malandro" - 24:50
Recorded at Talent Studio in Oslo, Norway in November 1977

Personnel
 Egberto Gismonti - 8-string guitar, kalimba, piano, wood flutes, voice, bottle
 Naná Vasconcelos - percussion, berimbau, tama, corpo, voice, bottle (tracks 2, 3 & 5)
 Ralph Towner - 12 string guitar (tracks 1 & 5)
 Collin Walcott - tabla, bottle (track 2)
 Jan Garbarek - soprano saxophone (track 5)

References

1978 albums
ECM Records albums
Albums produced by Manfred Eicher
Egberto Gismonti albums